Hydrophorus alboflorens is a species of long-legged fly in the family Dolichopodidae.

References

alboflorens
Articles created by Qbugbot
Insects described in 1849
Taxa named by Francis Walker (entomologist)